Chilcompton railway station was a station on the Somerset and Dorset Joint Railway at Chilcompton in the county of Somerset in England and opened on 20 July 1874. Originally the station consisted of a single platform on the Down side with a station building and possibly also a siding. In 1876 a loop and second platform were opened on the Up side, controlled from a 16-lever signal-box on the Down platform, which also controlled access to the goods yard. The line to Binegar was doubled in 1885. In 1886 the line to Midsomer Norton and Radstock was doubled and a replacement 13 lever signal box provided just beyond the Binegar end of the Up platform. The station closed to goods in 1964 and the signal-box closed in 1965; passenger services were withdrawn when the SDJR closed on 7 March 1966.

The site today 

As of 2020, The station is currently overgrown and partly fenced off in a transport yard. The line south from Midsomer Norton South  has been rebuilt by the Somerset & Dorset Railway Heritage Trust, whose aim is to restore a further stretch of the line as far as Chilcompton itself.

Further reading

References

External links 
 http://www.sdjrchilcompton.co.uk/
 Chilcompton station on navigable 1946 O. S. map

Disused railway stations in Somerset
Former Somerset and Dorset Joint Railway stations
Railway stations in Great Britain opened in 1874
Railway stations in Great Britain closed in 1966
Beeching closures in England
Mendip District